ImageMixer is a brand name of video editing software that edits digital video and still image in camcorders and authors to VCD and DVD. It is a second-party Japanese product, distributed by Pixela Corporation, a Japanese manufacturer of PC peripheral hardware and multimedia software.

Bundling 

ImageMixer is widely used for several camcorder brands, such as JVC, Hitachi and Canon. Also, Sony has chosen to package ImageMixer with its DVD and HDD Handycam.

ImageMixer series 
ImageMixer has other series of software for digital camera, such as ImageMixer Label Maker and ImageMixer DVD dubbing. ImageMixer also has movie editing solution for Macintosh.

Windows Vista version of ImageMixer 

A Windows Vista version of ImageMixer has been developed (ImageMixer3).

External links
Pixela Products Reseller Site
ImageMixer.com

Video editing software